Lucknow division is an administrative geographical unit of Uttar Pradesh state of India. Lucknow is the administrative headquarters of the division. The division consists of Lucknow, Hardoi, Lakhimpur Kheri, Raebareli, Sitapur, and Unnao.

Languages

References 

 
Divisions of Uttar Pradesh